Yang Tsung-hua (born March 29, 1991) is a Taiwanese professional tennis player. On the junior circuit, Yang reached a career-high combined ranking of No. 1 in 2008, when he won the French Open singles title against Polish player Jerzy Janowicz in two sets, and the Australian Open and Wimbledon doubles titles alongside Hsieh Cheng-peng.

Career

Juniors

Yang was named International Tennis Federation (ITF) Junior World Champion for the 2008 season by the ITF.

As a junior, he compiled a 66–23 win–loss record in singles (and 61–16 in doubles), achieving his combined ranking of No. 1 in the world in July 2008.

He reached 4 Junior Grand Slam finals in 2008, winning 3 titles. He started by losing the 2008 Australian Open – Boys' singles final, then rebounded to win the 2008 Australian Open – Boys' doubles, the 2008 French Open – Boys' singles and the 2008 Wimbledon Boys' Doubles titles.

Pro tour

Yang competes today on the ATP Challenger Tour and the ATP World Tour, both in singles and doubles. He reached his highest ATP singles ranking, No. 164, on 14 May 2012, and his highest ATP doubles ranking, No. 127, on 15 July 2019. Yang is coached by Lhen Man.

In the 2012 US Open, Yang reached the third qualifying round, where he lost to Teymuraz Gabashvili. Later he qualified to the ATP Bangkok, where he lost in first round to Grigor Dimitrov.

In 2013, he defeated Tatsuma Ito to reach semifinals of the An-Ning Challenger, where he lost to James Ward. At Kun-Ming he also reached semifinals after winning over Yuichi Sugita and Wu Di.

Yang defeated Marius Copil to reach third round of qualifying of the 2014 Australian Open, after which he lost to Dušan Lajović. At the Maui Challenger he reach the final, where he lost to Bradley Klahn. At the Liberec Challenger he beat world number 40 Pablo Cuevas and Norbert Gombos to reach semifinals, where he was defeated by Horacio Zeballos.

Challenger and Futures finals

Singles: 24 (11–13)

Doubles: 45 (25–20)

Junior Grand Slam finals

Singles: 2 (1 title, 1 runner-up)

Doubles: 2 (2 titles)

Singles performance timeline

Current through the end of 2021 Acapulco.

References

External links

 
 

1991 births
Living people
Asian Games medalists in tennis
Australian Open (tennis) junior champions
French Open junior champions
People from Hsinchu
Taiwanese male tennis players
Wimbledon junior champions
Tennis players at the 2010 Asian Games
Tennis players at the 2018 Asian Games
Asian Games gold medalists for Chinese Taipei
Medalists at the 2010 Asian Games
Universiade medalists in tennis
Universiade silver medalists for Chinese Taipei
Universiade bronze medalists for Chinese Taipei
Grand Slam (tennis) champions in boys' singles
Grand Slam (tennis) champions in boys' doubles
Medalists at the 2015 Summer Universiade